Rui Sousa Martins Silva (born 28 April 1993) is a Portuguese handballer for FC Porto and the Portuguese national team.

He represented Portugal at the 2020 European Men's Handball Championship and the 2021 World Men's Handball Championship.

Honours
Xico Andebol
Portuguese Cup: 2009–10

Sporting CP
Portuguese Cup: 2011–12, 2012–13, 2013–14
Portuguese Super Cup: 2013

Porto
Portuguese League: 2018–19, 2020–21
Portuguese Cup: 2018–19, 2020–21
Portuguese Super Cup: 2019, 2021

References

External links

1993 births
Living people
Portuguese male handball players
Sportspeople from Guimarães
FC Porto handball players
Sporting CP handball players
Handball players at the 2020 Summer Olympics